Andrea Pereira Cejudo (born 19 September 1993) is a Spanish professional footballer who plays as a defender for Liga MX Femenil side Club América and the Spain women's national team.

Career
Born in Barcelona, Pereira made her senior debut with the reserves of RCD Espanyol in 2009. Two years later, she played her first game in Primera División with the first team.

Pereira continued playing for Espanyol during five seasons, until 2016, when she signs a new contract with Atlético de Madrid.

International career
Pereira made her senior international debut in March 2016, starting a 0–0 friendly draw with Romania in Mogoșoaia.

Honours

Club
 RCD Espanyol
Copa de la Reina de Fútbol: Winner, 2012
Copa Catalunya: Winner, 2013

 Atlético Madrid
 Primera División: Winner, 2016–17, 2017–18

FC Barcelona
Primera División: 2019–20, 2020–21, 2021–22
UEFA Women's Champions League: 2020–21; 
Supercopa Femenina: 2019–20, 2021–22
Copa de la Reina: 2019–20, 2020–21

International
Spain
Algarve Cup: Winner, 2017

References

External links
 
 
 
 
 

1993 births
Living people
Spanish women's footballers
Primera División (women) players
RCD Espanyol Femenino players
Atlético Madrid Femenino players
Spain women's international footballers
Footballers from Barcelona
Women's association football central defenders
2019 FIFA Women's World Cup players
FC Barcelona Femení players
Sportswomen from Catalonia
UEFA Women's Euro 2022 players
UEFA Women's Euro 2017 players
Spain women's youth international footballers
21st-century Spanish women